"Willin'" is a song written by Lowell George while a member of the Mothers of Invention and subsequently recorded by his band Little Feat.  They first released it on their 1971 self-titled debut album. The band re-recorded the song at a slower tempo to much greater success on their 1972 Sailin' Shoes album. A live version recorded in 1977 appears on their 1978 album Waiting for Columbus.

The lyrics are from the point of view of a truck driver who has driven "from Tucson to Tucumcari, Tehachapi to Tonopah" and "smuggled some smokes and folks from Mexico"; the song has become a trucker anthem.  (It is not known whether the lyrics “. . . from Tucson to Tucumcari . . . " were inspired by the same line as spoken by the character “Turk”, about halfway through the 1961 Sam Peckinpah film, The Deadly Companions).

When Frank Zappa heard George sing a demo of "Willin'" as a Mothers of Invention song, he suggested that the guitarist form a band.

The song was subsequently recorded by Linda Ronstadt on her 1974 breakthrough album Heart Like a Wheel.

Personnel 
Source:
 Lowell George – lead, rhythm and slide guitars, lead and backing vocals
 Bill Payne – keyboards, backing vocals, piano
 Roy Estrada – bass, backing vocals
 Richard Hayward – drums, backing vocals

Additional
 Russ Titelman – percussion, backing vocals
 Ry Cooder – bottleneck guitar

Covers 
Seatrain covered the song (titled "I'm Willin') on their eponymous 1970 album. The song was covered by Linda Ronstadt on her 1974 Heart Like a Wheel album. This version was used in James Cameron's 1989 movie, The Abyss.

The Byrds recorded the song during the sessions for their 1970 album (Untitled) and performed the song live throughout that same year. The studio version was included as a bonus track on the reissue of (Untitled) and a live version is featured on The Byrds box set. Gene Parsons, who sang the song as a member of the Byrds, recorded his own version on his 1973 solo album Kindling. Commander Cody and his Lost Planet Airmen covered the song in 1975 on Commander Cody and His Lost Planet Airmen (album)

Phish covered the song live on Halloween in 2010 as part of their whole-album cover of Waiting for Columbus.

Mr. McFall's Chamber covered the song on their debut album, Like the Milk with vocals by their roadie, Dave Brady.

Bob Dylan has performed the song live.

Phil Pritchett covered this song as a duet with Cody Canada on his 2002 album Tougher Than the Rest. Jackson Browne covered this song with the band Lucius for the 2016 Showtime TV Series, Roadies. Gregg Allman covered “Willin’” in his last album, Southern Blood, released in 2017.
The Norwegian troubadour Stein Ove Berg covered this song with Norwegian lyrics on his album Vei-Viser (Road Tracks) in 1979. Another Norwegian artist named Johan Berggren covered the Stein Ove Berg version of Willin' on his album Ei Hytte Foran Loven (One Cabin Ahead of the Law) in 2021.
Richard Shindell covered a live version on his album Courier in 2002. 
The Black Crowes included a cover of the song as an iTunes-only bonus track on their acoustic album Croweology in 2010.

Mandy Moore covered the song on the soundtrack for the This Is Us television series.

In popular culture 
 The Linda Ronstadt version is featured prominently early in the James Cameron film The Abyss with multiple characters singing along as a submarine tows an underwater oil rig. Later another character destroys a radio playing the song.

References 

1971 songs
Song articles with missing songwriters
Songs about truck driving